Manoel Felciano (born November 12, 1970) is an American actor, singer, and songwriter.

Career
He received a humanities degree from Yale University. Felciano attended the Graduate Acting Program at New York University's Tisch School of the Arts, graduating in 2004. He joined the American Conservatory Theater (San Francisco)'s core acting program in 2009, having previously performed there in Edward Albee's At Home at the Zoo and Tom Stoppard's Rock 'n' Roll.

Feliciano is known for playing Tobias Ragg in the 2005 Broadway revival of Sweeney Todd: The Demon Barber of Fleet Street, for which he was nominated for a Tony Award for Best Performance by a Featured Actor in a Musical. In this production, all of the actors played their own instruments, with Felciano playing the piano, violin and clarinet.

He appeared in the "Reprise" (Los Angeles) production of Sunday in the Park with George in January 2007.
He appeared in the Williamstown Theatre Festival production of Three Sisters in July 2008, as "Andrei". He appeared at the Kennedy Center in Ragtime in April to May 2009, as "Tateh". He performed in the stage musical Anastasia at Hartford Stage (Connecticut) as "Gleb". The production ran from May 12 to June 12, 2016.

Profiled as an Adjunct Assistant Professor of Theatre by Columbia University School of the Arts in 2022.

Personal life
His father is Richard Felciano, a contemporary composer and UC Berkeley Professor Emeritus, and his mother is Rita Felciano, a dance critic.

Manoel Felciano has a Swiss passport and fluently speaks Swiss-German and French. He is part of the worldwide Baumgartner family which has branches in Switzerland (Zürich), Spain (Barcelona) and Australia (Sydney) and which is widely known for its creative and successful family members.

He lives with his wife, Christina, and their daughter, Vera. They live in Uptown Manhattan, New York.

Theatre credits
Broadway
Sweeney Todd: The Demon Barber of Fleet Street (Tony Award nomination)
Brooklyn
Jesus Christ Superstar
Cabaret (Broadway debut)
Amelie
Dear Evan Hansen

Off-Broadway
The Changeling
Trumpery
Shockheaded Peter
Much Ado About Nothing
By the Way, Meet Vera Stark
American Conservatory Theater
Clybourne Park
Round and Round the Garden
The Caucasian Chalk Circle
November
Edward Albee's At Home at the Zoo
Rock 'n' Roll
A Christmas Carol

Regional (U.S.)
Anastasia (Hartford Stage), 2016
Ragtime (The Kennedy Center), 2009
Three Sisters (Williamstown Theatre Festival), 2008
Sunday in the Park with George (Reprise Theatre Company), 2007

Filmography

Discography
Cast albums
1998 — Cabaret: The New Broadway Cast Recording
2004 — Brooklyn: The Musical (2004 Original Broadway Cast)
2005 — Sweeney Todd (2005 Broadway Revival Cast)
2017 — Amélie - A New Musical (Original Broadway Cast Recording)

Solo recordings

References

External links
Official website

1970 births
Living people
American male stage actors
Tisch School of the Arts alumni
Yale University alumni